Prof Ajit Kumar Mehta (born 3 February 1932 Fatehpur Bala, Samastipur district (Bihar)) was member of 6th Lok Sabha from Samastipur (Lok Sabha constituency) in Bihar State, India.

He was elected to 7th, 11th and 12th Lok Sabha from Samastipur.

References

1932 births
People from Samastipur district
India MPs 1980–1984
India MPs 1977–1979
India MPs 1996–1997
India MPs 1998–1999
Bihari politicians
Lok Sabha members from Bihar
Living people
Rashtriya Janata Dal politicians
Janata Party (Secular) politicians
Janata Party politicians
Janata Dal politicians
Praja Socialist Party politicians
Samyukta Socialist Party politicians
Lok Dal politicians